The 1968 Yale Bulldogs football team represented Yale University in the 1968 NCAA University Division football season.  The Bulldogs were led by fourth-year head coach Carmen Cozza, played their home games at the Yale Bowl and finished tied for first in the Ivy League season with a 6–0–1 record, 8–0–1 overall.  The season is notable for the final game against rival Harvard, which ended in a tie and resulted in The Harvard Crimson's famous headline Harvard Beats Yale 29-29.

Schedule

Roster

References

Yale
Yale Bulldogs football seasons
Ivy League football champion seasons
Yale Bulldogs football